Anavryti (Greek: Αναβρυτή) may refer to several places in Greece:

Anavryti, Aetolia-Acarnania, a village in the Apodotia municipality, Aetolia-Acarnania
Anavryti, Laconia, a village in the Mystras municipality, Laconia